The Valea Vadului is a river in Constanța County, Romania. Near the village Vadu it flows into the lagoon Balta Mare, which is connected with the Black Sea.

References

Rivers of Constanța County
Rivers of Romania
0Valea Vadului